Gen Digital, formerly known as Symantec and NortonLifeLock, is a multinational computer software company founded on March 1, 1982. It is an international corporation that specializes in selling security and information management software. Gary Hendrix founded the company in 1982 with the help of a National Science Foundation grant. Symantec was originally focused on artificial intelligence-related projects, and Hendrix hired several Stanford University natural language processing researchers as the company's first employees. After the company's initial public offering in 1989, Hendrix left the company in 1991 and moved to Texas. The company has acquired 57 companies, purchased stakes in 2 firms, and divested 26 companies, in which parts of the company are sold to another company. Of the companies that Symantec has acquired, 50 were based in the United States. Symantec has not released the financial details for most of these mergers and acquisitions.

Symantec's first acquisition was C&E Software on January 1, 1984, and the founder of C&E Software, Gordon Eubanks, became the new chief executive officer of Symantec. The company has made five acquisitions with a value greater than $1 billion: LifeLock was acquired on Feb 9, 2017 for $2.3 billion, Blue Coat Systems was acquired on Aug 1, 2016 for $4.65 billion, VeriSign was acquired on May 19, 2010 for $1.250 billion, Altiris was acquired on April 6, 2007 for $1.038 billion, and Symantec purchased Veritas Software on July 2, 2005 for $13 billion. The deal with Veritas was Symantec's largest acquisition and made Symantec the fifth-largest software company in the world. Symantec made the most acquisitions in 2004 with six: ON Technology, Brightmail, TurnTide, @stake, LIRIC Associates, and Platform Logic. The company divested its enterprise-security software business to Broadcom for $10.7 billion in 2019 and adopted the NortonLifeLock name. On November 7, 2022, NortonLifeLock rebranded to Gen Digital after completed its merger with Avast in last September.

Acquisitions

Investments

Stakes

Divestitures

Notes

References

Corporation-related lists
Computing-related lists
Lists of corporate mergers and acquisitions